The noncentral t-distribution  generalizes Student's t-distribution using a noncentrality parameter. Whereas the central probability distribution describes how a test statistic t is distributed when the difference tested is null, the noncentral distribution describes how t is distributed when the null is false. This leads to its use in statistics, especially calculating statistical power. The noncentral t-distribution is also known as the singly noncentral t-distribution, and in addition to its primary use in statistical inference, is also used in robust modeling for data.

Definitions
If Z is a standard normal random variable, and V is a chi-squared distributed random variable with ν degrees of freedom that is independent of Z, then

is a noncentral t-distributed random variable with ν degrees of freedom and noncentrality parameter μ ≠ 0. Note that the noncentrality parameter may be negative.

Cumulative distribution function
The cumulative distribution function of noncentral t-distribution with ν degrees of freedom and noncentrality parameter μ can be expressed as

where

 is the regularized incomplete beta function,

and Φ is the cumulative distribution function of the standard normal distribution.

Alternatively, the noncentral t-distribution CDF can be expressed as:

where Γ is the gamma function and I is the regularized incomplete beta function.

Although there are other forms of the cumulative distribution function, the first form presented above is very easy to evaluate through recursive computing. In statistical software R, the cumulative distribution function is implemented as pt.

Probability density function
The probability density function (pdf) for the noncentral t-distribution with ν > 0 degrees of freedom and noncentrality parameter μ can be expressed in several forms.

The confluent hypergeometric function form of the density function is

where 

and where 1F1 is a confluent hypergeometric function.

An alternative integral form is

A third form of the density is obtained using its cumulative distribution functions, as follows.

This is the approach implemented by the dt function in R.

Properties

Moments of the noncentral t-distribution
In general, the kth raw moment of the noncentral t-distribution is

In particular, the mean and variance of the noncentral t-distribution are

Asymmetry
The non-central t-distribution is asymmetric unless μ is zero, i.e., a central t-distribution. In addition, the asymmetry becomes smaller the larger degree of freedom. The right tail will be heavier than the left when μ > 0, and vice versa. However, the usual skewness is not generally a good measure of asymmetry for this distribution, because if the degrees of freedom is not larger than 3, the third moment does not exist at all. Even if the degrees of freedom is greater than 3, the sample estimate of the skewness is still very unstable unless the sample size is very large.

Mode
The noncentral t-distribution is always unimodal and bell shaped, but the mode is not analytically available, although for μ ≠ 0 we have

In particular, the mode always has the same sign as the noncentrality parameter μ. Moreover, the negative of the mode is exactly the mode for a noncentral t-distribution with the same number of degrees of freedom ν but noncentrality parameter −μ.

The mode is strictly increasing with μ (it always moves in the same direction as μ is adjusted in). In the limit, when μ → 0, the mode is approximated by 

and when μ → ∞, the mode is approximated by

Related distributions
Central t-distribution: the central t-distribution can be converted into a location/scale family.  This family of distributions is used in data modeling to capture various tail behaviors.  The location/scale generalization of the central t-distribution is a different distribution from the noncentral t-distribution discussed in this article. In particular, this approximation does not respect the asymmetry of the noncentral t-distribution. However, the central t-distribution can be used as an approximation to the noncentral t-distribution.
If T is noncentral t-distributed with ν degrees of freedom and noncentrality parameter μ and F = T2, then F has a noncentral F-distribution with 1 numerator degree of freedom, ν denominator degrees of freedom, and noncentrality parameter μ2.
When the denominator noncentrality parameter of a doubly noncentral t-distribution is zero, then it becomes a noncentral t-distribution.

Special cases
When μ = 0, the noncentral t-distribution becomes the central (Student's) t-distribution with the same degrees of freedom.

Occurrence and applications

Use in power analysis
Suppose we have an independent and identically distributed sample X1, ..., Xn each of which is normally distributed with mean θ and variance σ2, and we are interested in testing the null hypothesis θ = 0 vs. the alternative hypothesis θ ≠ 0. We can perform a one sample t-test using the test statistic

Since the right hand side of the second equality exactly matches the characterization of a noncentral t-distribution as described above, T has a noncentral t-distribution with n−1 degrees of freedom and noncentrality parameter .

If the test procedure rejects the null hypothesis whenever , where  is the upper α/2 quantile of the (central) Student's t-distribution for a pre-specified α ∈ (0, 1), then the power of this test is given by

Similar applications of the noncentral t-distribution can be found in the power analysis of the general normal-theory linear models, which includes the above one sample t-test as a special case.

Use in tolerance intervals
One-sided normal tolerance intervals have an exact solution in terms of the sample mean and sample variance based on the noncentral t-distribution. This enables the calculation of a statistical interval within which, with some confidence level, a specified proportion of a sampled population falls.

See also
 Noncentral F-distribution

References

External links
 Eric W. Weisstein. "Noncentral Student's t-Distribution." From MathWorld—A Wolfram Web Resource
 High accuracy calculation for life or science.: Noncentral t-distribution From Casio company.

Continuous distributions